Makar is the surname of the following people
Cale Makar (born 1998), Canadian hockey player
Dzmitry Makar (born 1981), Belarusian football player
Jimmy Makar (born 1956), American car racing official
Morena Makar (born 1985), Croatian snowboarder
Nancy Hogshead-Makar (born 1962), American swimmer
Oksana Makar (1993-2012), Ukrainian murder victim 
Scott Makar, American lawyer, college professor and judge
Volodymyr Makar (born 1990), Ukrainian football player

See also
Murder of Oksana Makar in March 2012 in Ukraine